Sweetmeat (foaled 1842) was a successful English Thoroughbred racehorse that won 16 consecutive races (including walk-overs) as a three-year-old, including the Doncaster Gold Cup, and was a useful sire of the early 19th century.

Background
He was a bay or brown colt foaled in 1842 that was sired by Gladiator, who became an important sire in France. Sweetmeat’s dam, Lollypop was sired by either Starch or Voltaire, as recorded in the General Stud Book, with Voltaire listed in second position, which indicates he was the last stallion to cover the mare and therefore the most likely sire of Lollypop. If Lollypop was indeed by Voltaire she was incestuously inbred to Blacklock, who was the sire of both Voltaire and Belinda (the dam of Lollypop).

Racing record

At two years
In July 1844 Sweetmeat won the Stanley Stakes at Liverpool. He then won a £220 sweep at Wolverhampton, and a 60 sovereign race at Wrexham, defeating three other horses. In the Two Year Old Stakes at Nottingham, he finished second.

At three years
Sweetmeat was undefeated in his 16 starts, including a number of walk-overs,  as a three-year-old, which included victories in the Ascot Gold Vase and the 2¼ mile Doncaster Gold Cup defeating Alice Hawthorne who had twice previously won the race.

At four and five years
Sweetmeat only started once at four, in the Chester Cup in which he was unplaced. At five he started once again, at Chester in the Cheshire Stakes, and was again unplaced.

Sweetmeat finished his racing career with 22 race starts for 19 wins, 1 second and 2 unplaced runs.

Stud record
In 1847 James Cookson purchased Sweetmeat for 300 guineas as a sire for his Neasham Hall Stud near Darlington. It was here that Cookson bred the great Formosa who won in 1868 the 1,000 Guineas Stakes, 2,000 Guineas Stakes, St. Leger Stakes, Epsom Oaks and Newmarket Oaks. Seven years earlier Cookson bred both Dundee and Kettledrum, who finished first and second in The Derby.  Sweetmeat stood at this stud until 1861 when, aged 19 and blind, he was sold for 800 guineas and exported to Russia.

His progeny included:
 Macaroni, who won the 2000 Guineas, Epsom Derby and Doncaster Cup; sired three Epsom Oaks winners and the top-class broodmare Lily Agnes (dam of Ormonde and granddam of Sceptre).
 Mincemeat (a half sister to Kettledrum, both being out of Hybla) won the Epsom Oaks Stakes and was the dam of 1000 Guineas winner Tomato.
 Mincepie (1853) won Epsom Oaks Stakes
 Muscovado exported to Australia, sire of stakes-winners including Lantern (won the Melbourne Cup)
 Nettle (1852) won Gimcrack Stakes, third dam of the Triple Crown winner Common
 Parmesan sire of two Derby winners and a French Oaks winner plus others.
 Plum Pudding (1857), sired Grand National (won the 1876 Irish Grand National), Billy Pitt (won Irish Derby) and Silk (dam of Master Kildare, undefeated juvenile in Ireland).
 Saccharometer (1860) won  King's Stand Stakes
 Sweetsauce (1857) won Goodwood Cup

Sire line tree

Sweetmeat
Muscovado
Lantern
Comquot
Plumb Pudding
Billy Pitt
Grand National
Parmesan
Favonius
Favo
Sir Bevys
Alladin
Country Boy
Beaver
Theodore
The Rector
Banter
Chilton Boy
The Vicar
Coolshannagh
Morglay
Ben Shie
Mountain Knight
Bevil
Lucerna
Eusebe
Le Torpilleur
Cremorne
Thurio
Voluptuary
St. George
Woodson
Red Bud
Stracchino
Spicebox
Sweetsauce
Macaroni
MacGregor
Craig Royston
Royston Crow
Scot Free
Macaroon
MacDuff
MacBeth
Saccharometer
Shifnal

See also
List of leading Thoroughbred racehorses

References

1842 racehorse births
Racehorses bred in the United Kingdom
Racehorses trained in the United Kingdom
Thoroughbred family 21-a
Byerley Turk sire line